Arpád Gögh (born 13 October 1972 in Horná Potôň) is a Slovak football midfielder who currently plays for club Gabčíkovo.

External links 
 
 

1972 births
Living people
Association football midfielders
Slovak footballers
FC DAC 1904 Dunajská Streda players
ŠK Futura Humenné players
Győri ETO FC players
ŠK Slovan Bratislava players
Pécsi MFC players
ŠK Senec players
Nemzeti Bajnokság I players
Slovak Super Liga players
Expatriate footballers in Hungary
Hungarians in Slovakia
People from Dunajská Streda District
Sportspeople from the Trnava Region